Babyland was an American performance-based independent electronic junk punk band from Los Angeles, California, featuring Dan Gatto performing vocals and electronics and Michael Smith on percussion. The band released six studio albums before disbanding in 2009: You Suck Crap (1992), A Total Letdown (1994), Who's Sorry Now (1995), Outlive Your Enemies (1998), The Finger (2004), Cavecraft (2008).

History
Babyland was formed in 1989 by vocalist and programmer Dan Gatto and percussionist Michael Smith out of Los Angeles, California. They were advocates of the DIY punk ethic and part of the musical underground culture and well regarded in Industrial music, punk rock, indie rock and electronic music communities. In 1991, the band released their debut EP 1991 and later that year the single Reality Under Smrow-Toh on the Los Angeles Punk rock label Flipside. In 1992 the song "Mindfuck" was provided to the If It Moves... compilation The Cyberflesh Conspiracy and the following year the band produced a cover of Madonna's "Burning Up" for the Shut Up Kitty: A Cyber-Based Covers Compilation by Re-Constriction Records.

Recordings prior to 1996 continued to be released by Flipside, including the band's first three albums: You Suck Crap (1992), A Total Letdown (1994) and Who's Sorry Now (1995). These albums were positively received by critics, with Alternative Press crediting the band with embodying "all the confusion, resentment, anger, and frustration felt by an entire generation." The band released their fourth studio album Outlive Your Enemies on Mattress Recordings in 1998. The band also participated in several of Flipside's Mojave Desert events. Subsequent material has been released by the band's own label, Mattress.

The fifth full length The Finger and a compilation of earlier songs Decade One was released in Europe by dependent. Most recently, a deal with Metropolis Records has resulted in the wider commercial release of the sixth album Cavecraft. A post to the band's Myspace site on October 9, 2009, confirmed the long-lived group's breakup. In 2013 the live album LIVE EXECUTION was released and documented a live performance made on January 1, 2009 at The Smell in Los Angeles.

Live performances
Known for their live performances, Babyland shared the stage with bands such as The Offspring, Ethyl Meatplow, Grotus, Legendary Pink Dots, Dystopia, Foetus, Add N to (X), Nitzer Ebb, VNV Nation, and Psychic TV.  Most of their live performances occurred in underground locations that have included places like LA's Jabberjaw, Kontrol Faktory, The Smell and 924 Gilman in Berkeley.

Other projects
In between recording for Babyland, vocalist Dan Gatto formed Recliner with Vampire Rodents composer Daniel Vahnke and produced the song's "Trilobite" and "Nosedive", which appeared on the 1993 compilation Rivet Head Culture. Both compositions appeared on Vampire Rodents' third studio album Lullaby Land later that year. Another collaboration by Recliner was recorded and titled "Zygote", released on the 1994 compilation Scavengers in the Matrix and later on Vampire Rodents' fourth album Clockseed in 1995. In 2012 vocalist Dan Gatto released a synthpop project called Continues.

Discography 
Studio albums
 You Suck Crap (Flipside, 1992)
 A Total Letdown (Flipside, 1994)
 Who's Sorry Now (Flipside, 1995)
 Outlive Your Enemies (Mattress, 1998)
 The Finger (Dependent/Mattress, 2004)
 Cavecraft (Mattress, 2008)

Extended plays
 1991 (Flipside, 1991)
 The Dogsnatcher EP (Flipside, 1992)
 2002 (Mattress, 2002)
 Past Lives (Mattress, 2004)
 Not Modern (Mattress, 2008)

Live albums
 LIVE EXECUTION (Mattress, 2013)

Compilation albums
 Decade One (Dependent, 2001)

Singles
 Reality Under Smrow-Toh (Flipside, 1992)
 Stomach (Flipside, 1993)

References

External links

Musical groups established in 1989
Musical groups disestablished in 2009
1989 establishments in California
2009 disestablishments in California
Musical groups from Los Angeles
American electro-industrial music groups
American industrial rock musical groups
American electronic body music groups
Dependent Records artists
Metropolis Records artists